The Roman Catholic Church in the Republic of the Congo consists of 3 ecclesiastical province comprising 6 suffragan dioceses.

List of dioceses

Episcopal Conference of the Republic of the Congo

Ecclesiastical Province of Brazzaville
Archdiocese of Brazzaville
Diocese of Gamboma
Diocese of Kinkala

Ecclesiastical Province of Owando
Archdiocese of Owando
Diocese of Impfondo
Diocese of Ouesso

Ecclesiastical Province of Pointe-Noire
Archdiocese of Pointe-Noire
Diocese of Dolisie
Diocese of Nkayi

External links 
Catholic-Hierarchy entry.
GCatholic.org.

Congo
Catholic dioceses